Hydroentanglement is a bonding process for wet or dry fibrous webs made by either carding, airlaying or wet-laying, the resulting bonded fabric being a nonwoven. It uses fine, high pressure jets of water which penetrate the web, hit the conveyor belt (or "wire" as in papermaking conveyor) and bounce back causing the fibres to entangle.

Hydroentanglement is sometimes known as spunlacing, this term arising because the early nonwovens were entangled on conveyors with a patterned weave which gave the nonwovens a lacy appearance. It can also be regarded as a two-dimensional equivalent of spinning fibres into yarns prior to weaving. The water pressure has a direct bearing on the  gsm, and strength of the web, and very high pressures not only entangle but can also split fibres into micro- and nano-fibres which give the resulting hydroentangled nonwoven a leatherlike or even silky texture. This type of nonwoven can be as strong and tough as woven fabrics made from the same fibres.

Composition 
Different types of staple length fibers and blends can be used in hydroentangled nonwoven fabrics. Polyester and cellulosic (regenerated cellulosic fibers such as viscose)  blend is most commonly used in these fabrics.

Characteristics 
The spun-lace fabrics have variable thickness and properties since they are  produced by varying processing parameters such as waterjet pressure, delivery speed, web mass and web composition. Primarily these fabrics are water absorbent and holds many other properties like water retention, water vapor permeability and capillary. They are  lightweight , soft, flexible and silky texture. They are disposable and affordable than peers.

Use 
They are suitable for many types of  wet wipes, kitchen wipes and aprons. By altering physical properties with lamination, coating, etc. these fabrics offer variety of products suitable  in use of hygiene care and medical textiles for instance sanitary napkins, baby wipes, face masks and range of medical gowns used as a part of PPE.

References

Bibliography 

Textiles
Textile techniques
Nonwoven fabrics